Tigres Island is an island in Angola. It is situated in the Namibe Province.

History
It is the largest island of Angola; its area is 98 km. It once had been a small peninsula in Tigres Strait known as Península dos Tigres with a well established fishing village named Saint Martin of the Tigers (in Portuguese: São Martinho dos Tigres).

The ocean broke through the isthmus of the peninsula on March 14, 1962, and the water line was severed. Tigres became an island overnight with no water supply. Later Tigres and the pump station at the Cunene river mouth were abandoned, and have become ghost towns slowly being reclaimed by the desert.

See also
List of lighthouses in Angola
 List of islands of Angola
 List of ghost towns

References

Islands of Angola
New islands
Lighthouses in Angola
Islands of the South Atlantic Ocean